I Gusti Ayu Bintang Darmawati (born 24 November 1968) is an Indonesian politician. She is also known as Bintang Puspayoga as she is married to Indonesian politician Anak Agung Gede Ngurah Puspayoga. , she serves as Minister of Women Empowerment and Child Protection in the 41st Cabinet of Indonesia. The first Balinese women to become minister.

References 

Living people
1968 births
Place of birth missing (living people)
21st-century Indonesian politicians
Women government ministers of Indonesia
Onward Indonesia Cabinet
Balinese people
21st-century Indonesian women politicians